Bobruysk Region (Bobruyskaya Oblast, Babruysk Voblast), created on September 20, 1944, was an administrative division of Belarus with its administrative centre at Babruysk. On January 8, 1954, the region was abolished and became part of Mogilev Region.

External links
Administrative divisions of Belarus: history (Russian)

Former subdivisions of Belarus
States and territories established in 1944
Byelorussian Soviet Socialist Republic